Gerald Church (28 January 1928 – 17 July 2021) was a Scottish amateur footballer who played as a left back in the Scottish League for Queen's Park. He was capped by Scotland at amateur level.

Life and career 
Church attended St Aloysius' College and University of Glasgow Medical School. Following two years in the Royal Army Medical Corps, he specialised in Internal Medicine and Cardiology. 

Church emigrated to the United States in the late 1950s and from 1960 worked at local Annapolis hospitals, including Anne Arundel Medical Center and North Arundel Hospital. He was later made a Fellow of the American College of Physicians and received an award of appreciation from the University of Maryland Baltimore Washington Medical Center for his service between 1966 and 2011. 

Church was married with four children. He died at home in Winchester-on-the-Severn, on 17 July 2021, at the age of 93.

References

1928 births
2021 deaths
Scottish footballers
Scottish Football League players
Queen's Park F.C. players
Association football fullbacks
Scotland amateur international footballers
Footballers from Glasgow
Glasgow University F.C. players
People educated at St Aloysius' College, Glasgow
Alumni of the University of Glasgow Medical School
Royal Army Medical Corps officers
Scottish emigrants to the United States